The Stephen Joseph Studio is a former German Protestant Church, now part of the University of Manchester, in Greenheys, Manchester, England. It used to lie on Wright Street (off Ducie Street), a street which no longer exists (grid reference ). It was mentioned in the Manchester Directory for 1858, with the pastor's name H. E. Marotsky (Hermann Eduard Marotsky); it should not be confused with the German Church in John Dalton Street, established by Joseph Steinthal in 1854. It was first occupied by the university in 1949 and had various uses before its use by the Department of Drama.

The main entrance lies on the west side of the building, with a side entrance on the north. The east side features a rose window. The building houses seven lecture rooms, with space for up to 179 students. It is named after Stephen Joseph, the pioneer of theatre in the round. Since the late 1970s the Mansfield Cooper Building has stood to the south-west.

References 

Coates, Su (=S. D. F. Thomas) (1991) "Manchester's German Gentlemen ... 1840-1920" in: Manchester Region History Review, vol. 5, no. 2, 1991/2; pp. 24
Williams, Bill (1976) The Making of Manchester Jewry, 1740-1875. Manchester: U. P. ; p. 334

External links

 Evangelische Synode Deutscher Sprache in Großbritannien - Manchester (website of the former owner of the Church)

Buildings at the University of Manchester
Churches in Manchester
Lutheran churches in the United Kingdom
Gothic Revival church buildings in England
Gothic Revival architecture in Greater Manchester